Knubel is a German surname that may refer to

 Bernard Knubel (1872–1957), German cyclist
 Bernhard Knubel (1938–1973), German rower
 Frederick Hermann Knubel (1870–1945), American Lutheran clergyman
 Josef Knubel (1881–1961), Swiss mountaineer 

German-language surnames